The  477th Tactical Fighter Squadron is an inactive United States Air Force unit. It was assigned to the 312th Tactical Fighter Wing at Cannon Air Force Base. New Mexico, where it was inactivated on 18 February 1959, when it transferred its personnel and equipment to another squadron.  It flew North American F-100 Super Sabres and deployed to support NATO forces in Germany.

It was consolidated in September 1985 with the 477th Bombardment Squadron, which served as a medium bomber training unit from 1942 to 1944, when it was disbanded in a reorganization of Army Air Forces training units, as the 477th Tactical Electronic Warfare Training Squadron, but the consolidated squadron has not been active.

History

Fighter operations
The 477th Fighter-Bomber Squadron was activated at Clovis Air Force Base, New Mexico in October 1957 as the fourth North American F-100 Super Sabre of the 312th Tactical Fighter Wing.  The squadron deployed to Turkey for NATO rotational commitments.  The squadron was inactivated in 1959 and transferred its personnel and equipment to the 481st Tactical Fighter Squadron when the 27th Tactical Fighter Wing moved on paper from Bergstrom Air Force Base, Texas to Cannon to replace the 312th Wing.

World War II training operations

The 477th Bombardment Squadron was activated on 17 July 1942 at Barksdale Field, Louisiana as one of the original components of the 335th Bombardment Group, and was equipped with Martin B-26 Marauders.  The 476th acted as a Replacement Training Unit (RTU) for the B-26. However, the AAF found that standard military units, whose manning was based on relatively inflexible tables of organization were not well adapted to the training mission.  Accordingly, in the Spring of 1944, the 335th Group, its components and supporting units at Barksdale, were disbanded on 1 May and replaced by the 331st AAF Base Unit (Medium, Bombardment).  The squadron was replaced by Section U of the new base unit.

Consolidation
The squadrons were consolidated as the 477th Tactical Electronic Warfare Training Squadron on 19 September 1985.

Lineage
 477th Bombardment Squadron
 Constituted as the 477th Bombardment Squadron (Medium) on 9 July 1942
 Activated on 17 July 1942
 Disbanded on 1 May 1944
 Reconstituted on 19 September 1985 and consolidated with the 477th Tactical Fighter Squadron as the 477th Tactical Electronic Warfare Training Squadron

 477th Tactical Electronic Warfare Training Squadron
 Constituted as the 477th Fighter-Bomber Squadron on 26 September 1957
 Activated on 8 October 1957
 Redesignated: 477th Tactical Fighter Squadron on 1 July 1958
 Inactivated on 18 February 1959
 Consolidated with the 477th Bombardment Squadron as the 477th Tactical Electronic Warfare Training Squadron on 19 September 1985

Assignments
 335th Bombardment Group, 17 July 1942 – 1 May 1944
 312th Fighter-Bomber Wing (later 312th Tactical Fighter Wing), 8 October 1957 – 18 February 1959 (detached 8 September – 11 December 1958)

Stations
 Barksdale Field, Louisiana, 17 July 1942 – 1 May 1944
 Clovis Air Force Base (Later Cannon Air Force Base, New Mexico, 8 October 1957 – 18 February 1959

Aircraft
 Martin B-26 Marauder, 1942-1944
 North American F-100 Super Sabre, 1957–1959

Campaigns

References

Notes
 Explanatory notes

 Citations

Bibliography

 
 
 
 
 
 

Military units and formations established in 1957